Leszek of Inowrocław (pl: Leszek inowrocławski; 1275/76 – after 27 April 1339), was a Polish prince member of the House of Piast. He was Duke of Inowrocław from 1287 to 1314 (under the regency of his mother until 1294), Duke of Pomerelia (Gdańsk Pomerania) in 1296, and ruler over Wyszogród from 1296. In he 1300 paid homage to King Wenceslaus II of Bohemia, in 1303 sold to the Teutonic Order the Michałów Land, during 1303–1312 in captivity in Bohemia, since 1312 vassal of the Kingdom of Poland, during 1314-1320/24 sole ruler over Inowrocław, abdicated.

He was the eldest son of Ziemomysł of Inowrocław and Salome, daughter of Sambor II, Duke of Pomerelia.

Life

After the death of their father in 1287, Leszek and his younger brothers Przemysł and Kazimierz III of Gniewkowo inherited his domains; however, because they are minors, remained under the regency of their mother and paternal half-uncle Władysław I the Elbow-high until 1294, when Leszek, as the oldest brother, attained his majority and assumed the government and the guardianship of his brothers. He received a good education (contemporary sources even refers to him as litteratus).

In 1296, using the confusion followed the death of Przemysł II he managed to claim the Duchy of Pomerelia, under the pretext of being a maternal descendant of the Samborides; however, shortly he was forced to resign the Duchy to Władysław I, who gave him in compensation the castellany of Wyszogród.

In 1300, after the pressure of King Wenceslaus II of Bohemia (recently crowned King of Poland), he paid homage to him. In 1303 Leszek was involved in a military conflict with his uncle Siemowit of Dobrzyń; this prolonged fight caused financial difficulties to the Duke of Inowrocław, and forced him to pledge the Michałów Land to the Teutonic Order. Soon after, and for unknown reasons, he went to Hungary to be reunited with his uncle Władysław I; because he had to pass for areas controlled by Wenceslaus II, he was captured and imprisoned, sent to Bohemia. His captivity lasted until 1312.

In 1314 Leszek agreed to become a vassal of Władysław I, shortly after, he finally decided to make the division of his domains with his brothers. As the oldest, Leszek kept the most important part of the Duchy, including the capital Inowrocław. Four years later, in 1318, he signed with his brother Przemysł a treaty of mutual inheritance.

Between 1320-1324 and for unknown reasons, Leszek abdicated the government of his domains, giving all the power to Przemysł. In 1320 and 1339 he testified during the Polish-Teutonic trial.

Leszek died after 27 April 1339, and is unknown where he was buried. He never married or had offspring.

Ancestry

References

Leszek Inowrocławski in poczet.com [retrieved 18 February 2015].

1270s births
1330s deaths
Piast dynasty
13th-century Polish people
14th-century Polish people
People of Byzantine descent